Pfeffer is a German surname.

Pfeffer may also refer to:

 Pfeffer (grape), a grape variety
 Bid Euchre variant Pfeffer, a card game
 Pfeffer (Brenz), a river of Baden-Württemberg, Germany, tributary of the Brenz

See also
 Pfeffer integral, in mathematics
 International Pfeffer Peace Award